The 1903 Alabama Crimson White football team (variously "Alabama", "UA" or "Bama") represented the University of Alabama in the 1903 college football season. The team was led by head coach W. A. Blount, in his first season, and played their home games at The Quad in Tuscaloosa and at West End Park in Birmingham, Alabama. In what was the eleventh season of Alabama football, the team finished with a record of three wins and four losses (3–4, 3–4 SIAA).  Alabama did not have another losing season until their 1951 season.

Alabama opened the season with a pair of shutout losses on the road. After their loss at Vanderbilt, they were defeated by Mississippi A&M at Columbus in what was their first all-time win against Alabama. They then won their first game against Auburn at Montgomery. Alabama then played back-to-back Monday games and lost to Sewanee at Birmingham and defeated LSU in the first Tuscaloosa game of the season. They then closed the season with a loss to eventual SIAA co-champion Cumberland and their first all-time victory over Tennessee in their final game on Thanksgiving.

Schedule

Scoring note:

Game summaries

Vanderbilt

Source:

Alabama opened the 1903 season with a 30–0 loss against Vanderbilt in the first all-time meeting between the schools at Dudley Field. Vanderbilt took an 18–0 halftime lead after first half touchdowns were scored twice by Ed Hamilton and followed by John J. Tigert. The Commodores then closed the game with two touchdowns in the second half scored by Dan Blake and Bob Blake for the 30–0 victory. Tigert converted all five PAT's in their victory. Frank Kyle starred for the Commodores in the contest with runs of 30, 35, 48 and 50-yards against the Crimson White.

The starting lineup was: R. L. Lodge (left end), Aubrey Boyles (left tackle), W. C. Oates (left guard), James C. Gwin (center), J. C. Fortune (right guard), John Roberts Peavy (right tackle), W. S. Sherrill (right end), W. S. Wyatt (quarterback), Auxford Burks (left halfback), Truman Smith (right halfback), Frank B. Clark (fullback).

Mississippi A&M

Source:

A week after their loss to Vanderbilt, Alabama was defeated the Aggies of Mississippi A&M (now known as Mississippi State University) 11–0 at the Columbus Fairgrounds in Columbus, Mississippi. The game was played before 5,000 fans in a light drizzle with the Aggies scoring all of their points in the second half after a scoreless first. The loss brought Alabama's all-time record against Mississippi A&M (Mississippi State) to 3–1.

Auburn

Sources:

After being shut out for their first two games, Alabama upset the Alabama Polytechnic Institute (now known as Auburn University) 18–6 before 1,200 fans at Riverside Park in Montgomery. J. V. Boyles scored a touchdown for Alabama to cap a 19-play, 79-yard drive on their opening possession and with the extra point took a 6–0 lead.

In the second half, Alabama extended their lead to 12–0 after Truman Smith scored on a 45-yard touchdown run. After Auburn cut the lead to 12–6 with a W. G. Boyd touchdown run, Alabama scored the final points of the game on a 25-yard Smith run for the 18–6 victory. The victory brought Alabama's all-time record against Auburn to 2–6.

The starting lineup was: R. L. Lodge (left end), Aubrey Boyles (left tackle), W. C. Oates (left guard), James C. Gwin (center), J. C. Fortune (right guard), John Roberts Peavy (right tackle), W. S. Sherrill (right end), W. S. Wyatt (quarterback), Auxford Burks (left halfback), Truman Smith (right halfback), Frank B. Clark (fullback).

Sewanee

Sources:

Playing Sewanee for the first time since the 1896 season, Alabama was shut out 23–0 at West End Park in Birmingham. John Schaffer starred for the Tigers with three separate runs of 40-yards in the victory. The game was originally scheduled to be played in Tuscaloosa, but was subsequently moved to Birmingham in an effort to increase gate receipts. The loss brought Alabama's all-time record against Sewanee to 1–3.

The starting lineup was: R. L. Lodge (left end), Aubrey Boyles (left tackle), W. C. Oates (left guard), James C. Gwin (center), Guy Redden (right guard), John C. McCorquodale (right tackle), W. S. Sherrill (right end), W. S. Wyatt (quarterback), Auxford Burks (left halfback), Truman Smith (right halfback), W. McMahon (fullback).

LSU

Sources:

Alabama secured their first all-time victory over LSU with its 18–0 win at Tuscaloosa. Both John Roberts Peavy and W. S. Sherrill scored first half touchdowns, and Truman Smith scored on a fake punt returned 65-yards for the 18–0 victory. The victory brought Alabama's all-time record against LSU to 1–2.

The starting lineup was: R. L. Lodge (left end), Aubrey Boyles (left tackle), W. C. Oates (left guard), James C. Gwin (center), Guy Redden (right guard), John Roberts Peavy (right tackle), W. S. Sherrill (right end), W. S. Wyatt (quarterback), Auxford Burks (left halfback), Truman Smith (right halfback), W. McMahon (fullback).

Cumberland
Against Cumberland University of Lebanon, Tennessee, Alabama lost 44–0 on The Quad in Tuscaloosa.

The starting lineup was: W. S. Sherrill (left end), John Roberts Peavy (left tackle), W. C. Oates (left guard), James C. Gwin (center), Guy Redden (right guard), Aubrey Boyles (right tackle), R. L. Lodge (right end), W. S. Wyatt (quarterback), Auxford Burks (left halfback), Truman Smith (right halfback), W. McMahon (fullback).

Tennessee

Source:

A week after their 44–0 loss to Cumberland, Alabama defeated Tennessee 24–0 at Birmingham. Alabama scored touchdowns on runs of three-yards by W. McMahon, one-yard by John Roberts Peavy, one-yard by Auxford Burks and two-yards by Truman Smith. The victory brought Alabama's all-time record against Tennessee to 1–0–1.

The starting lineup was: R. L. Lodge (left end), Aubrey Boyles (left tackle), Guy Redden (left guard), James C. Gwin (center), W. C. Oates (right guard), John Roberts Peavy (right tackle), W. S. Sherrill (right end), W. S. Wyatt (quarterback), Auxford Burks (left halfback), Truman Smith (right halfback), W. McMahon (fullback).

Players

Line

Backfield

Source:

Notes

References

Alabama
Alabama Crimson Tide football seasons
Alabama Crimson White football